Charles Weldon (June 1, 1940 – December 7, 2018) was an actor, director, educator, singer, and songwriter. He was the artistic director of the Negro Ensemble Company for thirteen years.  He was the co-founder of the Alumni of this company, and directed many of their productions. During his career he worked with Denzel Washington, James Earl Jones, Cicely Tyson, Alfre Woodard, Muhammad Ali, and Oscar Brown Jr.

Early years
Weldon's mother was Beatrice Jennings; his father was Roosevelt Weldon. The family moved from Wetumka, Oklahoma, to Bakersfield, California, when he was seven years old. As a young boy, he worked in the cotton fields of Bakersfield until the age of seventeen, when he joined a local doo-wop group. He graduated from Bakersfield High School in 1959. He was the brother of actress Ann Weldon, singer Maxine Weldon, and Mae Frances Weldon.

As the lead singer of The Paradons, he co-wrote the hit record "Diamonds and Pearls" in 1960. The group appeared on the Dick Clark's American Bandstand television show and also toured with James Brown and Fats Domino. After the group disbanded, Weldon joined the soul group Blues for Sale.

Career
Weldon began his acting career in 1969, with a role in the Oscar Brown Jr.'s musical Big-Time Buck White starring as Muhammad Ali. He joined the Negro Ensemble Company in 1970 and later became its artistic director in 2005.

In 1973, he was a part of the Broadway cast of The River Niger, with Cicely Tyson and James Earl Jones. The River Niger was written by Joseph A. Walker (playwright) and won a Tony Award for best play.

Weldon appeared in the original San Francisco production of Hair and directed and acted in many regional theaters. For the Denver Theater Center, he appeared in twelve productions. His last project was the short film Paris Blues in Harlem, which he co-produced and starred in with Nadhege Ptah and Michele Baldwin, who cast him in the project. Weldon starred in the role of the Jamaican Grim Reaper (the body-snatcher) in Sophia Romma's (playwright and Literary Manager of the Negro Ensemble Company from 2012) allegorical satire, The Blacklist at the 13th Street Repertory Company in 2016.

Onscreen
 Stir Crazy
 Serpico
 Malcolm X
 The Wishing Tree

Negro Ensemble Company Productions
In 2016 -  A Day of Absence by Douglas Turner Ward
In 1982 -  The Charles Fuller's Pulitzer Prize winner play A Soldier's Play.
In 1975 -  The Brownsville Raid 
In 1973 -  The Great Mac Daddy by Paul Carter Harrison
In 1973 -  The River Niger the Tony-winning Broadway production by Joseph A. Walker.
In 1970 - Ododo by Joseph Walker

Negro Ensemble Company as Director
 Colored People Time, by Leslie Lee
 The Waiting Room by Samm-Art Williams
 Savanna Black and Blue by Raymond Jones
 Ceremonies in Dark Old Men by Lonnie Elder III
 Hercules Didn't Wade in the Water by Michael A. Jones 
 Negro Ensemble Theater Companies 50th Anniversary revival of A Soldier's Play by Charles Fuller
 The Mire and With Aaron's Arms Around Me, by Sophia Romma https://www.broadwayworld.com/people/Sophia-Romma/at the Cherry Lane Theatre (2010)
 Cabaret Emigre, by Sophia Romma at the Lion Theatre (Theatre Row, 2012)

The Negro Ensemble Company Awards
 1982 -a Pulitzer Prize for A Soldier's Play
 Two Tony Awards
 Eleven Obies

Castillo Theater
2011: Directed The Picture Box
2013: Directed Stealing Home about Jackie Robinson

As an Actor
Filmography

1967: Who's Minding the Mint? - Guide (uncredited)
1972: Trick Baby - Tough
1975: Police Story (TV Series) - Stack / Harry Evans / James Reed
1975: Rooster Cogburn - Bailiff (uncredited)
1975: The Streets of San Francisco (TV Series) - J.W. Flowers 
1976: Kojak (TV Series) - 'Shotgun Willie' Baine
1976: Dynasty (TV Movie) - Sam Adams
1976: The River Niger - Skeeter
1976: Kiss Me, Kill Me (TV Movie) - Leonard Hicks
1976: Sanford and Son (TV Series) - Miss Wallace / Alex Hacker
1978: A Woman Called Moses (TV Series) - Shadrack Davis
1979: The Rockford Files (TV Series) - Watkins
1979: Roots: The Next Generations (TV Mini-Series) - Doxey Walker
1980: Stir Crazy 
1981-1982: Hill Street Blues (TV Series) - Connelly / Lt. Clayton Shaw
1982: American Playhouse (TV Series) - Beau Willie
1982: Fast-Walking - Officer Jackson
1983: Another Woman's Child (TV Movie) - Roland
1984: Gimme a Break! (TV Series) - Good Ol' Charlie Johnson
1985: The Atlanta Child Murders (TV Mini-Series) - John Bell
1985: St. Elsewhere (TV Series) - Andrew Turner
1986: L.A. Law (TV Series) - Cop #1
1987: Simon & Simon (TV Series) - Doug Belton
1988: Case Closed (TV Movie)
1989: The Women of Brewster Place (TV Series) - Tenant #5
1990-1999: Law & Order (TV Series) 
1992: Malcolm X - Follower at Temple #7
1994: Drop Squad - Uncle Omar
1994: New York Undercover (TV Series) - James Hampton / Croupier
1999: The Wishing Tree - Al 'Alfred' Brooks
2000: Clockin' Green (Video) - Al 'Alfred' Brooks
2001: Hoop Soldiers (Video)
2005: Law & Order: Trial by Jury (TV Series) - Juror #2
2018: Diane - Tom
2018: Paris Blues in Harlem (Short) - Pop Pop (final film role)

Awards
 Henry Award for Excellence in Regional Theater for Best Supporting Actor in Gem of the Ocean by August Wilson
 AUDELCO Award for Best Supporting Actor in Seven Guitars by August Wilson

References

External links
 Diamonds and Pearls
  "Diamonds and Pearls" - Charles Weldon of The Paradons
 Charles Weldon Interview

1940 births
Male actors from California
American male film actors
21st-century American male actors
African-American male actors
2018 deaths
African-American theater directors
American theatre directors
21st-century African-American people
20th-century African-American people